These individuals may or may not claim titles associated with an abolished monarchy. Individuals who stake claims to monarchical titles but who are not part of former dynasties are not included. Note that a country may have multiple houses with a claim to the defunct position.

Africa

Americas

Asia

India and Pakistan

Nepal

Nepal's numerous small monarchies were collectively abolished by the federal government on 7 October 2008. At the time, the thrones of both Salyan and Jajarkot had been vacant since the deaths of rajas Gopendra Bahadur and Prakash Bikram respectively (both in 2003), and have remained vacant.

Thailand

Europe

Source

Germany

Source

Italy

Source

Until the mid-nineteenth century, the Italian peninsula comprised a number of states, some of which were monarchies. During the Italian unification, the monarchs of such agglomerated states lost their sovereignty and their titles became purely ceremonial. The resultant throne of the Kingdom of Italy was held by the former king of Sardinia.

Oceania

See also 

 Abolition of monarchy
 List of current constituent monarchs
 List of last scions
 List of living former sovereign monarchs
 List of usurpers
 Monarchism

Notes

Africa

Americas

Asia

Europe

Oceania

References

Further reading 

 List of Pretenders
Pretenders